Project Laundry List was a New Hampshire group that encouraged the outdoor drying of clothes, "making air-drying laundry and cold-water washing acceptable and desirable as simple and effective ways to save energy," as quoted from their mission statement. It supports what is sometimes called the "right to dry".

It provided information to help change laws and prevent neighborhoods, private housing developments, and apartment complexes from outlawing clothes lines because of aesthetic reasons, under the stated principle "All citizens nation-wide should have the legal right to hang out their laundry."

The organization was founded by a resident of Concord, New Hampshire, Alexander Lee, but went into hiatus after Lee moved to China in 2010 and as of 2017 does not appear to be extant.

References

External links 
 Project Laundry List
 "Clothesline Rule Creates Flap" Boston Globe article March 13, 2008
 N.Y. Times article Dec. 2007

Laundry organizations
Organizations based in New Hampshire